Baby on Board is a 2009 comedy film starring Heather Graham, John Corbett, Jerry O'Connell, Anthony Starke and Lara Flynn Boyle.

Plot 
The film centers around Angela Marks, an ambitious, image-conscious businesswoman working for over-demanding boss Mary. When Angela becomes unexpectedly pregnant at the peak of her career, her life with her divorce attorney husband, Curtis, is turned upside-down. The film begins with an inconvenient pregnancy that leads to a nine-month roller coaster ride as Angela and Curtis try to cope — even as the interference of best friends Danny and Sylvia escalate the situation into a battle of the sexes.

Credits
Although credited as Lara Flynn Boyle in the opening credits, her name is spelled Laura Flynn Boyle in the closing credits. The film's opening credits scene features British singer Natasha Bedingfield's song I Wanna Have Your Babies.

Reception

References

External links 
 
 

2009 films
American comedy films
2000s pregnancy films
2009 comedy films
American pregnancy films
Films scored by Teddy Castellucci
Films shot in Chicago
Films set in Chicago
2000s English-language films
Films directed by Brian Herzlinger
2000s American films